The FIFA World Player of the Year was an association football award presented annually by the sport's governing body, FIFA, between 1991 and 2015 at the FIFA World Player Gala. Coaches and captains of international teams and media representatives selected the player they deem to have performed the best in the previous calendar year.

Originally a single award for the world's best men's player, parallels awards for men and women were awarded from 2001 to 2009. The men's award was subsumed into the FIFA Ballon d'Or in 2010 while the women's award remained until 2015. After 2015 both men's and women's awards became part of The Best FIFA Football Awards.

During the men's era, Brazilian players won 8 out of 19 years, compared to three wins – the second most – for French players. In terms of individual players, Brazil again led with five, followed by Italy and Portugal with two each. The youngest winner was Ronaldo, who won at 20 years old in 1996, and the oldest winner was Fabio Cannavaro, who won aged 33 in 2006. Ronaldo and Zinedine Zidane each won the award three times, while Ronaldo and Ronaldinho were the only players to win in successive years. From 2010 to 2015, the equivalent men's award was the FIFA Ballon d'Or, following a merging of the FIFA World Player of the Year and the France Football Ballon d'Or awards. Since 2016, the awards have been replaced by The Best FIFA Men's Player and The Best FIFA Women's Player awards.

Eight women's footballers – three Germans, three Americans, one Brazilian, and one Japanese – have won the award. Marta, the youngest recipient at age 20 in 2006, has won five successive awards, the most of any player. Birgit Prinz won three times in a row and Mia Hamm won twice in a row. The oldest winner is Nadine Angerer, who was 35 when she won in 2013; she is also the only goalkeeper of either sex to win.

Voting and selection process
The winners are chosen by the coaches and captains of national teams as well as by international media representatives invited by FIFA. In a voting system based on positional voting, each voter is allotted three votes, worth five points, three points and one point, and the three finalists are ordered based on total number of points. Following criticism from some sections of the media over nominations in previous years, FIFA has since 2004 provided shortlists from which its voters can select their choices.

FIFA World Player of the Year

Source:

From 2010 to 2015, the award was merged with the Ballon d'Or to become the FIFA Ballon d'Or in a six-year partnership with France Football. In 2016, FIFA rebranded the award as The Best FIFA Men's Player.

A single article from the Portuguese magazine A Bola reporting about the 1992 award mentions the former award winners Lothar Matthäus in 1991, but also Diego Maradona in 1990. There is no other evidence of the award being presented by FIFA prior to 1991.

Wins by player

Wins by country

Wins by club

FIFA Women's World Player of the Year

Source:

In 2016, FIFA created The Best FIFA Women's Player award instead.

Wins by player

Wins by country

Wins by club

See also

 List of sports awards honoring women
 Ballon d'Or
 FIFA Ballon d'Or
 The Best FIFA Football Awards
 FIFPRO World 11

Notes

References 

 
Player of the Year
Awards established in 1991
Awards established in 2001
Awards disestablished in 2009
Awards disestablished in 2015
Lists of women's association football players
Women's association football player of the year awards
Association football player non-biographical articles